Astrobee is the designation of series of American sounding rockets with 1 - 3 stages.

Aerojet-designed family of sounding rockets conceived as a lower-cost replacement of the liquid-propellant Aerobee.

Several versions were realized:

 The three-stage Astrobee 500 (first stage: Genius, second stage: Alcor, third stage: Asp) has a ceiling of 1000 km, a takeoff thrust of 161 kN, a takeoff weight of 900 kg, a diameter of 0.38 m and a length of 7.80 m.
 The three-stage Astrobee 1500 (first stage: Recruit, second stage: Aero jet, third stage: Alcor) has a ceiling of 1000 km, a takeoff thrust of 566 kN, a takeoff weight of 5200 kg, a diameter of 0.79 m and a length of 10.40 m.
 The two-stage Astrobee 200 (first stage: Genius, second stage: Alcor) has a ceiling of 350 km, a takeoff thrust of 161 kN, a takeoff weight of 800 kg, a diameter of 0.38 m and a length of 6.30 m.
 The single-stage Astrobee D has a ceiling of 140 km, a takeoff thrust of 23.00 kN, a takeoff weight of 100 kg, a diameter of 0.15 m and a length of 3.90 m.
 The single-stage Astrobee F has a ceiling of 375 km, a takeoff thrust of 178.00 kN, a takeoff weight of 1500 kg, a diameter of 0.38 m and a length of 11.50 m.

External links

Article title 
Article title 
Article title 
Article title 
Article title

Sounding rockets of the United States